Almand is a surname. People with the surname include:

Alan Almand (born 1943), British rower
Bond Almand (1894–1985), Chief Justice of the Supreme Court of Georgia
James F. Almand (born 1948), Virginia attorney, politician, and judge
John Parks Almand (1885–1969), American architect

See also
Almond (surname)
Allemande, a Renaissance and Baroque dance